Yan Senkevich (born 18 February 1995) is a Belarusian professional footballer playing as a midfielder for Olimpia Elbląg.

References

External links
 
 
 Profile at Neman website

1995 births
Living people
Belarusian footballers
Association football midfielders
Belarusian expatriate footballers
Expatriate footballers in Poland
FC Belcard Grodno players
FC Neman Grodno players
FC Granit Mikashevichi players
FC Dnepr Mogilev players
FC Smolevichi players
FC Sputnik Rechitsa players
FC Lida players
FC Gorodeya players
FC Smorgon players
Olimpia Elbląg players
II liga players